This is a list of Ugandan women writers, including writers either from or associated with Uganda.

A
 Grace Akello (born 1950)
 Regina Amollo (born c. 1954)
 Harriet Anena
 Lillian Aujo

B
 Doreen Baingana (born 1966)
 Evangeline Barongo
 Violet Barungi (born 1943)
 Mildred Barya
 Jackee Budesta Batanda

E
 Angella Emurwon

G
 Asiimwe Deborah GKashugi

H
 Jessica Horn (born 1979)

K
 Jane Kaberuka (born 1956)
 Barbara Kaija (born 1964)
 Nyana Kakoma
 Keturah Kamugasa (died 2017)
 Catherine Samali Kavuma (born 1960)
 China Keitetsi (born 1976)
 Susan Nalugwa Kiguli (born 1969)
 Barbara Kimenye (1929–2012)
 Goretti Kyomuhendo (born 1965)

L
 Beatrice Lamwaka

M
 Jennifer Nansubuga Makumbi
 Irshad Manji (born 1968)
 Rose Mbowa (1943–1999)

N
 Rose Namayanja (born 1975)
 Beverley Nambozo
 Glaydah Namukasa
 Victoria Nalongo Namusisi (born 1956)
 Philippa Namutebi Kabali-Kagwa (born 1964)
 Monica Arac de Nyeko (born 1979)

O
 Juliane Okot Bitek (born 1966)
 Mary Karooro Okurut (born 1954)

P
 Ife Piankhi

R
 Rose Rwakasisi (born 1945)

S
 Nakisanze Segawa

T
 Lillian Tindyebwa
 Hilda Twongyeirwe

W
 Ayeta Anne Wangusa (born 1971)

Z
 Elvania Namukwaya Zirimu (1938–1979)

See also
 List of women writers

Ugandan writers
writers
Ugandan women writers, List of